Attiya Gamri (born 1972) is a Dutch-Assyrian member of the province council of Overijssel in The Netherlands. Gamri is originally from Arbo in Tur Abdin, Turkey.

In 2017 Gamri was the president of the Assyrian Confederation of Europe, a non-governmental organization that represents Assyrians living in the European Union.

In 2021 she became the first woman of Assyrian heritage to contest a national election in Europe.

External links
Attiya Gamri

References

Dutch politicians of Assyrian descent
Living people
Dutch people of Assyrian/Syriac descent
1972 births